INS Nireekshak (A15) (Inspector) is a diving support vessel (DSV) of Indian Navy. It can also function as interim submarine rescue vessel (SRV).

Nireekshak was originally built by M/S Mazagon Dock Limited, Mumbai, for the Oil and Natural Gas Corporation's offshore oil exploration work, having a dynamic position facility and a recompression chamber. It was however acquired on lease with an option for purchase by Indian Navy and was commissioned on 8 June 1989. The ship was modified and refitted with the diving bell and other rescue equipment removed from the former Russian submarine rescue vessel  in a dry dock. In March 1995 the purchase option was invoked and the vessel was formally re-commissioned on 15 September 1995. The ship is equipped with two Deep Submergence Rescue Vehicles (DSRV), capable of taking 12 men to 300 meters together, with two six-man recompression chambers and one three-man diving bell. It is intended to facilitate rescue from a submarine in distress and training of saturation divers. Its pennant number is A-15.

On 16 April 2016, a sailor lost his leg while two others were injured in an oxygen cylinder explosion on board the ship. The explosion took place while a diving bailout bottle, a small 12-inch oxygen bottle which is carried by divers in their diving helmet, was being charged. This incident has never happened in history of the Indian Navy before. One sailor sustained serious injuries and his right leg was amputated from just above the knee and two other sailors received splinter injuries in the stomach region and legs. They were admitted in Military Hospital, Trivandrum as ship was on it way to Mumbai from Visakhapatnam.

Gallery

See also
 List of active Indian Navy ships
 Future ships of the Indian Navy

References

External links

 Indian Navy: Diving Support Ship Nireekshak

Auxiliary ships of the Indian Navy
Training ships of the Indian Navy
Ships built in India